John Davis (August 31, 1954 – May 24, 2021) was an American singer based in Germany. He was one of the real vocalists for Milli Vanilli and The Real Milli Vanilli who, along with Brad Howell, Charles Shaw and backup vocalists Linda Rocco & Jodie Rocco, provided the real vocals for Milli Vanilli.

Early life 
Davis was born on August 31, 1954, in Anderson, South Carolina. Davis lived most of his life in Germany after he was stationed there in the 1970s while serving in the US Army.

Music career 
During the 1970s Davis played his music in Army clubs in Germany. He began singing for Milli Vanilli in the 1980s after meeting German music producer Frank Farian. Farian approached Davis to work on a project with him, but did not disclose the details of the project, which were that Davis's voice would be used for other performers to lip-sync. Davis realized only later that his voice was being used by Fabrice Morvan, one of two pretend singers of the duo Milli Vanilli, the other being Rob Pilatus. Morvan and Davis performed together on the project "Face Meets Voice" in later years, and they appeared together on German television in 2015.

Albums 
In 1984 Davis released an electro album called Destination Earth.  After it was revealed that Morvan and Pilatus were not the true singers for Milli Vanilli, Farian re-did the album that was already planned for the original duo, renaming the 1991 album The Moment of Truth, and the duo, Davis and Brad Howell, the Real Milli Vanilli. The album was the only one the pair made, and it was never released in the US. It made it to Germany's Top 20 albums.

Personal life 
Davis had a daughter, Jasmine Davis.

Death 
Davis died in Nuremberg, Germany from COVID-19 on May 24, 2021, at the age of 66.

References 

1954 births
2021 deaths
People from Anderson, South Carolina
Singers from South Carolina
20th-century American singers
Deaths from the COVID-19 pandemic in Germany
20th-century American male singers